Events from the year 2003 in Romania.

Incumbents 

President: Ion Iliescu 
Prime Minister: Adrian Năstase

Events

February 

 5 February – The new labour code is published in the Monitorul Oficial.
 14 February – The remains of Carol II and of his wife, Magda Lupescu, are repatriated from Portugal and placed inside the Curtea de Argeș Cathedral.

March 

 1 March – The new labour code enters force.

May 

 24 May – The Democratic Party celebrates its 10 year anniversary in Constanța without its founder, Petre Roman.

October 

 18–19 October – The 2003 Romanian constitutional referendum takes place.

Deaths

May

 15 May - Constantin Dăscălescu, Prime Minister of Romania (b. 1923)

September

 9 September - Andrei Folbert, 72, Romanian basketball player.

October

 4 October - Elisabeta Rizea, 91, Romanian anti-communist partisan, viral pneumonia.
 12 October - Ion Ioanid, 77, Romanian dissident and writer.

November

 22 November - Iosif Budahazi, 56, Romanian fencer (men's individual sabre, men's team sabre at the 1972 Summer Olympics).

See also
 
2003 in Europe
Romania in the Eurovision Song Contest 2003

References

External links 

 

2000s in Romania
 
Romania
Romania
Years of the 21st century in Romania